There are several Akabori amino acid reactions, which are named after Shirō Akabori  (1900–1992), a Japanese chemist.

In the first reaction, an α-amino acid is oxidised and undergoes decarboxylation to give an aldehyde at the former α position by heating with oxygen in the presence of a reducing sugar. This reaction is useful for preparing dichlorophthalimido derivatives of peptides for mass spectral analysis.

In the second reaction, an α-amino acid, or an ester of it, is reduced by sodium amalgam and ethanolic HCl to give an α-amino aldehyde. This process is conceptually similar to the Bouveault–Blanc reduction except that it stops at the aldehyde stage rather than reducing the ester all the way to two alcohols.

See also
Maillard reaction

References 

Organic redox reactions
Name reactions